James William McCarthy (30 January 1853 – 24 December 1943) was a Roman Catholic clergyman who served as Bishop of Galloway in Scotland from 1914 to 1943.

Born in Newcastle upon Tyne, England, on 30 January 1853, he was educated at St Mary's College, Blairs 1869-1872; Royal Scots College, Valladolid 1872-1876 and St Peter's Seminary 1876-1879. He was ordained to the priesthood in Glasgow on 4 May 1879. He was curate at Our Lady and St Margaret's, Kinning Park 1879-1884 and parish priest of St John's, Port Glasgow 1884-1899. He was parish priest of St Mary Immaculate, Pollokshaws 1899-1900 and administrator of St Andrew's Cathedral, Glasgow 1900-1914.

He was appointed as Bishop of the Diocese of Galloway by the Holy See on 25 May 1914, and consecrated to the Episcopate on 9 June 1914. The principal consecrator was Donald Aloysius Mackintosh, Coadjutor Archbishop of Glasgow, and the principal co-consecrators were James August Smith, Archbishop of St Andrews and Edinburgh and John Joseph Keily, Bishop of Plymouth.

He died in office on 24 December 1943, aged 90.

References 

1853 births
1943 deaths
People from Newcastle upon Tyne
20th-century Roman Catholic bishops in Scotland
Bishops of Galloway (Roman Catholic, Post-Reformation)
English Roman Catholic bishops